Achmad Figo Ramadani (born 25 December 2001) is an Indonesian professional footballer who plays as a defender for Liga 1 club Arema and the Indonesia national team.

Club career

Arema
He was signed for Arema to play in Liga 1 in the 2021 season. Figo made his first-team debut on 23 October 2021 as a substitute in a match against Persiraja Banda Aceh at the Maguwoharjo Stadium, Sleman.

International career
In January 2022, Figo was called up to the senior team in a friendly match in Bali by Shin Tae-yong. He earned his first cap in a 4–1 win friendly match against Timor Leste on 27 January 2022.

Career statistics

Club

Notes

International

Honours

Club
Arema
Indonesia President's Cup: 2022

References

External links
 Achmad Figo at Soccerway
 Achmad Figo at Liga Indonesia

2001 births
Living people
Indonesian footballers
People from Malang
Sportspeople from Malang
Sportspeople from East Java
Arema F.C. players
Liga 1 (Indonesia) players
Association football defenders